Carlos Cárdenas Olivera (born December 13, 1983, in Mexico City) is a professional Mexican footballer who currently plays for Veracruz, as a defender.

External links

1983 births
Living people
Footballers from Mexico City
C.D. Veracruz footballers
C.F. Mérida footballers
Association footballers not categorized by position
21st-century Mexican people
Mexican footballers